Judge Brooks may refer to:

Gene Edward Brooks (1931–2004), judge of the United States District Court for the Southern District of Indiana
George Washington Brooks (1821–1882), judge of the United States District Courts for the Albemarle, Cape Fear and Pamptico Districts of North Carolina and the Eastern District of North Carolina
Henry Luesing Brooks (1905–1971), judge of the United States Court of Appeals for the Sixth Circuit
Timothy L. Brooks (born 1964), judge of the United States District Court for the Western District of Arkansas